Carl Marquis is a paralympic athlete from Canada competing mainly in category T54 wheelchair racing events.

Carl competed in the 100m, 800m and 1500m in the 1996 Summer Paralympics but it was not until he teamed him with his fellow Canadians in the T52-53 4 × 400 m relay that he won a medal, a bronze.  This would prove to be his only medal despite competing in a total of seven events over the 2000 and 2004 Summer Paralympics he would fail to win another medal.

References

Paralympic track and field athletes of Canada
Athletes (track and field) at the 1996 Summer Paralympics
Athletes (track and field) at the 2000 Summer Paralympics
Athletes (track and field) at the 2004 Summer Paralympics
Paralympic bronze medalists for Canada
Living people
Medalists at the 1996 Summer Paralympics
Year of birth missing (living people)
Paralympic medalists in athletics (track and field)
Canadian wheelchair curling champions
Canadian wheelchair curlers
Canadian male wheelchair racers